Hoosac Valley High School is a public institution of secondary education located in Cheshire, Massachusetts, United States.  It primarily serves students residing in the towns of Adams, Cheshire, and Savoy.  Hoosac Valley, abbreviated HVHS, hosts grades 8 through 12. It, along with Hoosac Valley Elementary School comprise the Hoosac Valley Regional School District. The 7th and 8th graders of the HVRSD attend classes at Hoosac Valley High School, though they may not take part in many high school sports unless there is a shortage of players, and their section of the school is known as Hoosac Valley Middle School and the younger children stay, for the most part, separated from the older ones throughout the duration of the school day.

History
Hoosac Valley High School opened in the year 1970, with the first class graduating in 1971.  HVHS replaced Adams Memorial High School, the current location of the Adams Memorial Middle School.  For a brief time, Adams Memorial Middle School closed due to the building being unsafe and its students (grades 7 & 8) moved to Hoosac Valley High School.  A major renovation of the Hoosac Valley High School campus forced the student population (grades 7–12) to take classes at the Adams Memorial Middle School campus. Work on the Hoosac Valley High School campus began in 2010 and was completed in time to readmit students (now grades 6–12) in the fall of 2012. In 2019, the school district containing the high school renamed from the Adams-Cheshire Regional School District to the Hoosac Valley Regional School District.

Hoosac trivia and tradition
HVHS's school colors are red and white. 

Sports teams use the name "Hurricanes," with Sparky the Lightning Bolt as their mascot. Occasionally, the name "Hurricanes" is shortened to just "Canes."

Like most schools, Hoosac has a rival: Drury High School, located in North Adams, Massachusetts.

In 2009, the Hoosac Boys' Basketball team made it to the Massachusetts championships, coincidentally playing their rival Drury for the Western Mass Champions title. Hoosac won the Western Mass title and later lost in the state semifinals to the Milton High Wildcats.

In the 2009–2010 school year, the Hurricane football team won the Western Massachusetts Division II Championship with a record of 12–0.

References

External links
Hoosac Valley High School website
Adams-Cheshire Regional School District website

Educational institutions established in 1970
Schools in Berkshire County, Massachusetts
Public high schools in Massachusetts